Oeste Towers (Galician and Spanish: Torres de Oeste) is a castle in Catoira, Galicia, Spain. It is located at the head of the Ría de Arousa. It is in the region of Caldas (Pontevedra), in the river Ulla estuary. The towers remaining today are the ruins of Castellum Honesti. Torres del Oeste has been declared a national monument.

In the 9th century, King Alfonso III of Leon built the castle as a defense against Viking attacks. The two remaining towers are from this period, and have a pre-Roman style. Pre-Roman ceramics and bronze tools have been discovered at the site. Two centuries later, King Alfonso V of Leon donates the fortress to the bishopric of Iria-Compostela, held at that moment by bishop Vestruarius. Subsequent bishops Cresconio, Diego Pelaez and Diego Gelmirez undertook the commitment to strengthen the Castle in order to protect the holy site of Santiago de Compostela. The structure of the Castle was defined in the 12th century. At that time, the enclosure of the Castle was formed by seven towers, and it was surrounded by marshes. The Castle has a 12th-century chapel built by Gelmirez to honor the apostle Saint James. The Castellum Honesti began its decline in the 15th century.

Each summer, the first Sunday of August, a celebration recalls the repulse of a Viking invasion.

See also 
 Vikings in Iberia

References

External links
 Turismo Rías Baixas

Castles in Galicia (Spain)
Bien de Interés Cultural landmarks in the Province of Pontevedra